Carlos Correa (born 1994) is a Puerto Rican baseball player.

Carlos Correa may also refer to:
 Carlos René Correa (1912–1999), Chilean poet
 Carlos Correa (painter) (1912–1985), Colombian painter
 Gabriel Correa (footballer) (Carlos Gabriel Correa Viana, born 1968), Uruguayan footballer and coach
 Carlos Rodrigues Corrêa (born 1980), Brazilian footballer
 Carlos Correa (activist), Venezuelan activist, journalist and business leader
 Carlos Correa (footballer), Uruguayan footballer